Nicholas Smith (born 12 June 1988) is a former Australian rules footballer, who played for the Sydney Swans in the Australian Football League (AFL).

Smith was educated at Scotch College, Melbourne (where he captained Cyril Rioli), and then played with the Oakleigh Chargers. He represented Vic Metro in the under-18 national championships before being picked as a rookie in the 2007 Rookie Draft at number 15.

He made his AFL senior debut in round 5, 2008 against Geelong after being promoted off the Rookie List earlier in the season. Playing a further senior game against Hawthorn kicking his first senior AFL goal during the match. He was elevated to the Sydney Swans senior list full-time at the end of the 2008. In 2009, he continued to add to his game tally by playing the last 11 matches of the season and was re-signed for a further two years.

In 2010, Smith returned to the senior side playing in the back pocket and as a midfield tagger. He played on some of the best players in the competition and often managed to severely limit their influence. Those players included Luke Hodge, Dan Giansiracusa, Mark Le Cras, Steve Johnson, Stephen Hill, Eddie Betts and Luke Power.

Smith's 2011 season was another consistent showing. He played mostly as a small defender and continued to play on the most dangerous players in the league. His year was rewarded with 6th place in the 2011 Bob Skilton Medal.

Smith was rewarded for his hard work with a spot in the 2014 All Australian team.

His father Mal played one game for St Kilda in 1982.

As of the end of the 2018 AFL season, Smith has played the most AFL games of any player without polling a single Brownlow Medal vote.
Smith's 2019 season was beset by injury. Fears that he might not play again were realised when on 14 August 2019, Smith announced his retirement from AFL football.

Statistics

|- 
! scope="row" style="text-align:center" | 2008
|style="text-align:center;"|
| 40 || 2 || 1 || 0 || 11 || 7 || 18 || 4 || 4 || 0.5 || 0.0 || 5.5 || 3.5 || 9.0 || 2.0 || 2.0 || 0
|- 
! scope="row" style="text-align:center" | 2009
|style="text-align:center;"|
| 40 || 11 || 1 || 1 || 71 || 77 || 148 || 31 || 31 || 0.1 || 0.1 || 6.5 || 7.0 || 13.5 || 2.8 || 2.8 || 0
|-  
! scope="row" style="text-align:center" | 2010
|style="text-align:center;"|
| 40 || 16 || 4 || 0 || 90 || 102 || 192 || 42 || 38 || 0.3 || 0.0 || 5.6 || 6.4 || 12.0 || 2.6 || 2.4 || 0
|- 
! scope="row" style="text-align:center" | 2011
|style="text-align:center;"|
| 40 || 23 || 2 || 1 || 189 || 132 || 321 || 76 || 82 || 0.1 || 0.0 || 8.2 || 5.7 || 14.0 || 3.3 || 3.6 || 0
|-
| scope=row bgcolor=F0E68C | 2012#
|style="text-align:center;"|
| 40 || 22 || 0 || 3 || 162 || 164 || 326 || 67 || 87 || 0.0 || 0.1 || 7.4 || 7.5 || 14.8 || 3.0 || 4.0 || 0
|- 
! scope="row" style="text-align:center" | 2013
|style="text-align:center;"|
| 40 || 24 || 1 || 1 || 167 || 167 || 334 || 72 || 75 || 0.0 || 0.0 || 7.0 || 7.0 || 13.9 || 3.0 || 3.1 || 0
|-  
! scope="row" style="text-align:center" | 2014
|style="text-align:center;"|
| 40 || 23 || 0 || 1 || 188 || 169 || 357 || 83 || 59 || 0.0 || 0.0 || 8.2 || 7.3 || 15.5 || 3.6 || 2.6 || 0
|- 
! scope="row" style="text-align:center" | 2015
|style="text-align:center;"|
| 40 || 21 || 0 || 2 || 202 || 150 || 352 || 110 || 64 || 0.0 || 0.1 || 9.6 || 7.1 || 16.8 || 5.2 || 3.0 || 0
|-  
! scope="row" style="text-align:center" | 2016
|style="text-align:center;"|
| 40 || 25 || 1 || 1 || 218 || 129 || 347 || 93 || 79 || 0.0 || 0.0 || 8.7 || 5.2 || 13.9 || 3.7 || 3.2 || 0
|- 
! scope="row" style="text-align:center" | 2017
|style="text-align:center;"|
| 40 || 24 || 0 || 1 || 164 || 138 || 302 || 111 || 44 || 0.0 || 0.0 || 6.8 || 5.8 || 12.6 || 4.6 || 1.8 || 0
|-  
! scope="row" style="text-align:center" | 2018
|style="text-align:center;"|
| 40 || 20 || 0 || 1 || 135 || 153 || 288 || 90 || 52 || 0.0 || 0.1 || 6.8 || 7.7 || 14.4 || 4.5 || 2.6 || 0
|- 
! scope="row" style="text-align:center" | 2019
|style="text-align:center;"|
| 40 || 0 || — || — || — || — || — || — || — || — || — || — || — || — || — || — || —  
|- class="sortbottom"
! colspan=3| Career
! 211
! 10
! 12
! 1597
! 1388
! 2985
! 779
! 615
! 0.0
! 0.1
! 7.6
! 6.6
! 14.1
! 3.7
! 2.9
! 0
|}

References

External links

Sydney Swans players
Sydney Swans Premiership players
1988 births
Living people
Australian rules footballers from Victoria (Australia)
All-Australians (AFL)
People educated at Scotch College, Melbourne
Australia international rules football team players
One-time VFL/AFL Premiership players